Old High Court is a metro station on the East-West Corridor of the Ahmedabad Metro. It was inaugurated by Prime Minister Narendra Modi on 30 September 2022. This will be the first interchange station after the North-South Corridor of the Ahmedabad Metro becomes operational around the year 2024.

Station Layout

References

Ahmedabad Metro stations